Heliosia punctinigra is a moth of the family Erebidae. It was described by Rudolf van Eecke in 1920. It is found on Java in Indonesia.

References

Nudariina
Moths described in 1920